Liwa is a province (wilayat) in Al Batinah Region, Oman. It lies north of Sohar and has a lively market place where local produce and fresh fish are sold. The fortress of Awla Ya'rab, built of white clay, is located on the beach in the Harmul area. The area also has a number of rural features such as springs, falaj and caves: Ain al Azam cave faces the creek and is surrounded by mangrove trees, while Jebel Abu Kahif is home to some of the largest caves in the province.

References

Provinces of Oman